Chloraka is a village in the Paphos District of Cyprus,  north of Paphos. The town is host to Akritas Chlorakas, a Cypriot First Division football team. Notably, Akritas Cholorakas has beaten Omonoia AC on their debut home game with a 1-0 score.

References

Communities in Paphos District